Ennery is a commune in the Gonaïves Arrondissement, in the Artibonite department of Haiti.
It has 31,285 inhabitants.

References

Populated places in Artibonite (department)
Communes of Haiti